This page is a partial list of casinos that are important or well-known.

Australia

Australian Capital Territory
 Casino Canberra (Canberra)

New South Wales
 The Star, Sydney (Sydney)
Crown Sydney (Sydney)

Northern Territory
 Lasseters Hotel Casino (Alice Springs)
 Mindil Beach Casino (Formerly Skycity Casino) (Darwin)

Queensland
 The Star Gold Coast (formerly Jupiters Hotel and Casino) (Gold Coast)
 The Reef Hotel Casino (Cairns)
 The Ville Resort-Casino (Townsville)
 Treasury Casino (Brisbane)

South Australia
 Adelaide Casino (formerly Skycity Adelaide) (Adelaide)

Tasmania
 Country Club Casino (Launceston)
 Wrest Point Hotel Casino (Hobart)

Victoria
 Crown Melbourne (Melbourne)

Western Australia
 Crown Perth (formerly Burswood Casino) (Perth)

Bahamas
 Atlantis Paradise Island (Paradise Island)
 Baha Mar (Nassau)

Belgium
 Knokke Casino (Knokke)

Cambodia
 NagaWorld (Phnom Penh)

Canada

Alberta

British Columbia
 Gateway Casinos
 Hard Rock Casino Vancouver (Coquitlam)
 River Rock Casino Resort (Richmond)

Manitoba
 Aseneskak Casino (Opaskwayak Cree Nation)
 Club Regent Casino (Winnipeg)
 McPhillips Station Casino (Winnipeg)
 South Beach Casino (Scanterbury)

Nova Scotia
 Casino Nova Scotia (Halifax and Sydney)

Ontario
Commercial
 Caesars Windsor (Windsor)
 Casino Niagara (Niagara Falls)
 Casino Rama (Rama)
 Niagara Fallsview Casino Resort (Niagara Falls)
 Woodbine Racetrack Casino (Toronto)

Charity
 CNE Casino (Toronto)
 Great Blue Heron Casino (Port Perry)
 Elements Casino Brantford
 OLG Casino Sault Ste. Marie
 OLG Casino Thousand Islands (Gananoque)

Quebec
 Casino de Charlevoix (La Malbaie)
 Casino du Lac-Leamy (Gatineau)
 Montreal Casino (Montreal)

Saskatchewan
 Casino Regina

China

Macau

Cotai Strip
 City of Dreams
 Galaxy Macau
 MGM Cotai
 Pousada Marina Infante
 Studio City
The Londoner Macao
 The Parisian Macao
 The Venetian Macao
 Wynn Palace

Macau Peninsula
 Casino Lisboa
 Grand Lisboa
 L'Arc Casino
 MGM Grand Macau
 Wynn Macau

Taipa Island
 Altira Macau

Finland

 Casino Helsinki

Germany

 Bad Homburg Casino
 Bad Oeynhausen Casino
 Bad Steben Casino
 Baden-Baden Casino
 Berlin Casino Potsdamer Platz
 Bremen Casino
 Dortmund Casino Hohensyburg
 Duisburg Casino
 Hamburg Casino Esplanade
 Wiesbaden Casino

Greece

 Porto Carras Grand Resort (Chalkidiki)

India

 Casino Goa

Italy 

 Casinò di Campione (Campione d'Italia)
 Casinò di Sanremo (Sanremo)

Kazakhstan 
 Casino Zodiak (Kapchagay)

Lebanon

 Casino du Liban (Jounieh)

Laos
Savan Vegas

Malaysia
Genting Casino (Resorts World Genting)
SkyCasino (Resorts World Genting)

Malta
 Dragonara Casino (St. Julian's)

Monaco

 Monte Carlo Casino (Monte Carlo)

The Netherlands
 Holland Casino

New Zealand
 Christchurch Casino
 Grand Casino (Dunedin Casino)
 SkyCity Auckland
 Skycity Hamilton
 Skycity Queenstown

Philippines
Golden Nile Bar & Casino in Angeles City
Wild Orchid Resort & Poker Room in Angeles City
Casino Filipino Angeles in Angeles City
Casino Filipino Olongapo in Olongapo
Subic Venecia Casino in Subic Bay Freeport Zone
Oriental Paradise Casino in Subic Bay Freeport Zone
Royce Hotel and Casino in Clark, Pampanga
Casino Filipino San Pedro in San Pedro, Laguna
Casino Filipino Tagaytay in Tagaytay
Casino Filipino Cavite in Bacoor
Casino Filipino Bacolod in Bacolod
Arcade-Amigo Hotel in Iloilo City
Waterfront Cebu City Hotel & Casino in Cebu City
City of Dreams Manila
Okada Manila
Manila Grand Opera House Hotel and Casino in Manila
Solaire Resort & Casino

Portugal

 Casino da Póvoa (Póvoa de Varzim)
 Casino Estoril (Cascais)
 Casino Lisboa (Lisbon)

Romania
Constanța Casino
Sinaia Casino
Vatra Dornei Casino

Slovenia
Grand Casino Portorož

Singapore

 Marina Bay Sands
 Resorts World Sentosa

South Africa

 Montecasino
 Sibaya Casino
 Sun City
 Suncoast Casino
 Rio Casino Resort

South Korea
 Kangwon Land Casino (Jeongseon)

Spain

Cantabria
 Gran Casino del Sardinero (Santander)

Community of Madrid
 Casino de Madrid

Catalonia
 Peralada Castle

Sweden

 Casino Cosmopol

Switzerland
 Casinò Lugano
 Montreux Casino

United Kingdom
 Gala Casinos
 Grosvenor Casinos
 Maxims Casino (Westcliff-on-Sea)
 Opera House Casino (Scarborough)
 Resorts World Birmingham

London
 Aspinall's
 Crockfords
 Grosvenor Casinos
 Maxims Casino

United States

Vietnam
 Casino Phú Quốc
 Casino Hà Nội

See also
 List of casino hotels
 List of defunct gambling companies
 Lists of tourist attractions

References